Joanne Butland (born 24 November 1978) is an Australian who has played association football, Australian rules football and international rules football.

Association football

Club career
Butland played in the Women's National Soccer League for Canberra Eclipse and QAS Sting.

International career
She played four matches for the Australia women's national association football team in 1999 and 2000.

Australian rules football
After changing sports at the suggestion of her sister-in-law she soon became a star for North Cairns in the AFL Cairns Women's League. She was the league best and fairest four times in five years between 2003 and 2008. She was selected in the All-Australian team between 2005 and 2007 and also in 2011 being named All-Australian Captain in 2007.. She was, as of 2009, player-coach of North Cairns.

International rules football
Butland was a member of the Australia women's international rules football team that played against Ireland in the 2006 Ladies' International Rules Series.

References

1978 births
Living people
Women's Australian rules footballers
Australian women's soccer players
Footballers who switched code
Women's association football goalkeepers
Australia women's international rules football team players